Kurregion Elbe-Heideland was a Verwaltungsgemeinschaft ("administrative community") in the district of Wittenberg, in Saxony-Anhalt, Germany. It was situated on the left bank of the Elbe, southeast of Wittenberg. It was disbanded in July 2009. The seat of the Verwaltungsgemeinschaft was Bad Schmiedeberg.

The Verwaltungsgemeinschaft Kurregion Elbe-Heideland consisted of the following municipalities (population in 2005 in brackets):

Bad Schmiedeberg * (4.217) 
Korgau (347) 
Meuro (620) 
Pretzsch (1.662) 
Priesitz (270) 
Schnellin (330) 
Söllichau (943) 
Trebitz (1.311)

Former Verwaltungsgemeinschaften in Saxony-Anhalt